The albums discography of British musician and singer-songwriter Elton John consists of 31 studio albums, 5 live albums, 10 soundtrack albums, 16 compilation albums, 4 extended plays, 3 tribute albums, 4 collaboration albums, and 2 holiday albums.

In 1969, John's debut album, Empty Sky, was released. In 1970, John released his self-titled second album Elton John, which featured his first hit single, "Your Song". John's commercial success was at its peak in the 1970s, when he released a streak of chart-topping albums in the US and UK, including Honky Château (1972), Don't Shoot Me I'm Only the Piano Player (1973), Goodbye Yellow Brick Road (1973), Caribou (1974), Captain Fantastic and the Brown Dirt Cowboy (1975), and Rock of the Westies (1975). John continued his success in the 1980s and 1990s, having several hit albums including 21 at 33 (1980), Too Low for Zero (1983), Sleeping with the Past (1989), The One (1992), Made in England (1995), and The Big Picture (1997). John has continued to record new music since then, including the albums Songs from the West Coast (2001), The Diving Board (2013), Wonderful Crazy Night (2016), and The Lockdown Sessions (2021). In 2017, John released the greatest hits album Diamonds, spanning his hits from 1970 to 2016.

Throughout his career, John has sold over 300 million records worldwide, making him one of the best-selling music artist of all time. John's biggest selling studio album is Goodbye Yellow Brick Road, which has sold more than 30 million copies worldwide and ranks among the best-selling albums worldwide. According to RIAA, he has sold 79 million albums in the United States, making him the 6th-best-selling male solo artist in history. Also according to RIAA, he has sold 35 million singles in the US.  In 2019, Billboard ranked him as the greatest solo artist of all time (third overall behind the Beatles and the Rolling Stones). John has accumulated 9 No. 1 singles on the Billboard Hot 100 and 7 No. 1 albums on Billboard 200. John is also Billboards greatest male solo artist on the Hot 100 of all time (third overall, behind the Beatles and Madonna).

Studio albums

Notes

Collaboration albums

Holiday albums

Live albums

Soundtrack albums

Compilation albums

Tribute albums

Extended plays

See also
 Elton John singles discography
 Rock and Roll Hall of Fame
 Songwriters Hall of Fame

References

External links

Discography
Rock music discographies
Discographies of British artists
Pop music discographies